This article discusses tie-ins for Thunderbirds, a British Supermarionation television series created by Gerry and Sylvia Anderson and produced by AP Films (later Century 21 Productions).

Since its first broadcast in 1965, Thunderbirds has generated more than 3,000 tie-in products. These include episode novelisations, children's toys and video games. By 1966, Century 21 had granted merchandise licenses to over 120 companies and turnover from these licensees was roughly £6 million (or £ million in ). In 1995, sales in Japan totalled approximately £60 million a year (or £ million in ).

For a discussion of screen and audio adaptations of Thunderbirds, as well as imitations and references in various media, see Works based on Thunderbirds.

Audio plays

From 1965 to 1967, Century 21 Records released 19 Thunderbirds audio plays on 7-inch, 33 RPM, vinyl EP records (promoted as "mini-albums").

Books
Between 1966 and 1967, eight original Thunderbirds novels were written by John William Jennison (four under the pseudonym "John Theydon") and Kevin McGarry. Three of the novels focus on the character of Lady Penelope. In 1992, Corgi Books published four children's novelisations by Dave Morris.

In 2008, Minnesota-based FTL Publications, in association with Diamond Comic Distributors, launched a new series of original novels by Joan Marie Verba. Verba had attempted to obtain the licence as early as 2004, while Carlton Television was in the process of merging with ITV Granada. After waiting several months, she contacted Granada, and after three years of discussions FTL Publications was finally granted the licence in 2007. It was the first licence for Thunderbirds titles to be given to an American publisher, and the books constitute the first new, official series of Thunderbirds novels to be written since the 1960s. Countdown to Action, published in June 2008, reveals the founding of International Rescue, exploring the establishment of the organisation and the construction of its machines. The other books highlight the individual Tracy brothers, as well as Brains.

List of novels and novelisations

Comics

A comic strip featuring the characters of Lady Penelope and Parker, set prior to their joining International Rescue, debuted in the first weekly issues of AP Films Publishing's children's title TV Century 21 in early 1965, several months prior to the first broadcast of "Trapped in the Sky". A full-length "Thunderbirds" strip debuted in the comic's 51st issue, published in January 1966. Originally written by editor and Thunderbirds TV scriptwriter Alan Fennell, this mostly replaced the "Lady Penelope" strip, which moved to a sister comic of the same name. The "Thunderbirds" strip, illustrated by Frank Bellamy, was the centrepiece of TV Century 21 (re-branded TV 21 in January 1968) for 186 issues and 30 serials, until October 1969. At their peak, combined weekly sales of TV Century 21 and Lady Penelope in the 1960s numbered 1.3 million. In 1966, Thunderbirds featured as a strip in the Daily Mail.

A Thunderbirds Annual was published by Century 21 Publishing from 1966 to 1968, and a Lady Penelope version until 1969. Thunderbirds also appeared in the parent TV Century 21/TV 21 annual until 1969; the same year, a joint Captain Scarlet and Thunderbirds annual was released. Starting in October 1991, the Bellamy-illustrated strips, as well as some that had first appeared in Lady Penelope, were reprinted in Fleetway Publications' fortnightly Thunderbirds: The Comic. Again edited by Fennell, this new title had a 30-month publication run and achieved peak sales of 100,000 copies. Reprints had previously appeared in Polystyle Publications' Countdown and Thunderbirds Holiday Special series in the 1970s and 1980s. In 1992, Ravette Books reprinted 13 strips in a graphic album series.

Games
In 1985, the first Thunderbirds video game was released for the Commodore 64 and ZX Spectrum; the title required the player to pilot Thunderbird 1 and Thunderbird 2 and explore an Egyptian-style labyrinth. In 1989, Grandslam Entertainment released a title for the Commodore 64 and Commodore Amiga, Amstrad CPC, Atari ST, MSX and ZX Spectrum. A NES version was released by Activision the following year. In 1993, a title by Super Famicom, subtitled Kokusou Kyuujotai Shutsudou Seyo!, was released in Japan only. SCi Games published a Game Boy Color title in 2000. The following year, it released a collection of Microsoft Windows themes and screensavers titled "F.A.B Action Pack", as well as Thunderbirds: International Rescue for the Game Boy Advance. In 2004, a second Game Boy Advance title was released by Vivendi Universal Games. A new Thunderbirds video game was released in Europe for the PlayStation 2 in July 2007; the North American release was cancelled.

In 2015, a co-operative Thunderbirds board game, designed by Matt Leacock, was released to coincide with the series' 50th anniversary. The game was published by Modiphius Entertainment and three expansion sets were released in 2016.

Home video
The 1980s and 1990s saw a number of Thunderbirds VHS releases by PolyGram and its subsidiary, Channel 5 Video Distribution. These proved to be a significant commercial success for Channel 5. Due to rights concerns, not all episodes were released unedited; some were issued in the "Super Space Theater" format, for which pairs of thematically similar episodes had been combined to create double-length compilation films for US broadcast syndication. The compilations were: Thunderbirds to the Rescue (combining "Trapped in the Sky" and "Operation Crash-Dive"), Thunderbirds in Outer Space ("Sun Probe" and "Ricochet") and Countdown to Disaster ("Terror in New York City" and "Atlantic Inferno"). The videos opened with a brief introduction by Parker, informing the viewer of other Gerry Anderson video releases. Volume 12 contained a selection of Lyons Maid advertisements featuring characters from the Anderson productions, and Volume 14 a "Making of Thunderbirds" featurette.

Upon its acquisition of the brand in 1999, Carlton International Media commenced work on remastering Thunderbirds for the first Region 2 DVD releases. Dolby 5.1 surround sound was added, and the existing picture and mono sound cleaned up with the aid of digital restoration and noise reduction technology. In addition, the original soundtrack was enhanced with the insertion of new sound effects and background foley (mainly explosions, aircraft and other mechanical noise, and vocal echo).

Region 1 DVDs were released by North American distributor A&E Home Video in 2001, with a "Complete Series" box set following in 2002; it was re-released in slimmer packaging in 2008. The same year, Thunderbirds was released, both in instalments and as a box set, on Blu-ray Disc in the UK. The region-free version distributed in Region B presents episodes in a vertically panned and scanned, 16:9 aspect ratio; a Japanese set, released by Geneon Universal in 2013, restores the original 4:3 picture. In 2015, Timeless Media Group and Shout! Factory (through their deal with ITV) released the complete series on DVD and Blu-ray in the US with the episodes in their original full-screen ratio).

UK releases
The following is not an exhaustive list.

US releases
The following is not an exhaustive list.

Music
The first Thunderbirds-exclusive music record was the mini-album Great Themes from Thunderbirds, published by Century 21 Records in 1967. Two soundtrack albums were released by Silva Screen Records, to favourable reviews by AllMusic and Uncut magazine, in 2003 and 2004. A 40th-anniversary releasethe double album The Best of Thunderbirdswas released in 2005. In 2015, Fanderson released a four-disc limited-edition set exclusively for its members in celebration of the 50th anniversary; it contains music either written for, or used in, all but one episode ("Cry Wolf", which contains no original or exclusive music).

Beyond the TV series, composer Barry Gray's contributions to Thunderbirds included four original songs recorded exclusively for audio release: "Lady Penelope", "Parker", "Parker Well Done" and "The Abominable Snowman", all sung in character by Sylvia Anderson and David Graham.

Soundtrack releases

Great Themes from Thunderbirds (1967)

Thunderbirds (Original Television Soundtrack) (2003-2004)

Volume 1

Volume 2

The Best of Thunderbirds (2005)

Thunderbirds (2015, Fanderson)

Toys
When Thunderbirds was first broadcast, AP Films Merchandising awarded licences to companies including Matchbox and Dinky to manufacture plastic and die-cast toy vehicles. It issued approximately 120 such licences, even buying a company (J. Rosenthal) to keep up with demand. Among Dinky's first releases were a  FAB 1 (of which more than two million were made) and Thunderbird 2 (some of which were blue instead of green); these two toys continued to be produced until 1976 and 1979, respectively. By 1966, commentators had dubbed the end-of-year shopping season "Thunderbirds Christmas" in the light of the series' popularity.

Japanese model kits of the vehicles continued to be marketed into the 1980s. In the early 1990s, Matchbox launched a new range of toys to coincide with the series' revival on the BBC. Sales in the run-up to Christmas 1991 suffered when demand overwhelmed supply. However, by Christmas 1992, the series had provided manufacturers and retailers with the most successful UK merchandising campaign since Star Wars. Matchbox's Tracy Island playset quickly became the UK's most sought-after toy, resulting in stock shortages, fights in shops, and a black market for the item; the story was reported in the national press. The 1991 Matchbox range included:

 Tracy Island Electronic Playsetwith sounds and moveable palm trees. The stock shortage caused by this item's popularity was reported on BBC News.
 Electronic Thunderbird 1with mechanised wings, firing light and sound
 Electronic Thunderbird 2with sounds and miniature Thunderbird 4
 Die-cast Thunderbirds 1 to 4 and FAB 1were also available in commemorative packaging as a Radio Times exclusive
 Pullback-action toysThunderbirds 1, 2 and 4
 Thunderbird 2 pod vehiclesthe Mole, Firefly and Recovery Vehicle; all compatible with the electronic Thunderbird 2
 Action figuresTracy brothers, Jeff Tracy, Brains, the Hood, Lady Penelope and Parker
Tracy brother dolls

In 1993, the BBC children's programme Blue Peter broadcast a making-of showing viewers how to build their own Tracy Island out of "old newspaper, pipe cleaners, yoghurt pots, cereal packets and bits of sponge". Demand for a free instruction sheet detailing the process was so high that the BBC stopped sending the sheets out and released presenter Anthea Turner's demonstration, titled "Blue Peter Makes a Thunderbirds Tracy Island", on home video. 

When the BBC repeated Captain Scarlet and the Mysterons in the early 2000s, the Thunderbirds toy licence was re-issued to Vivid Imaginations, who produced a new range for the series' second BBC revival in 2000. The 2000 Vivid Imaginations range included:

 Tracy Island Soundtech Electronic Playsetwith 12 sounds
 Tracy Island Powertech Transforming Playsetwith vehicle hangars and sounds
 Thunderbirds 1 to 4 Soundtech Electronic Playsetswith miniature figures and sounds
 Action Adventure Setto scale with the Thunderbird 2 playset, featuring the Mole, Firefly, the Hood's submarine and six figures
 Thunderbirds 1 to 5, FAB 1 and the Mole
 Action figures and dolls

The release of the live-action film, Thunderbirds, in 2004  prompted renewed interest in Thunderbirds toys. The film tie-ins were produced by Bandai. For the series' 40th anniversary in 2005, some items from the Vivid range were re-released in different packaging. The following decade, Vivid produced a new line of toys for the remake series Thunderbirds Are Go. As of 2019, Thunderbirds Are Go toys are distributed by Bandai in the UK, Modern Brands in Australia and Planet Fun in New Zealand.

Art 	
As part of the activities surrounding the 50th anniversary of the TV show, ITV invited the pop art brand Art & Hue to create a new print collection based on Thunderbirds.

The first annual "International Thunderbirds Day" was celebrated on 30 September 2017, the 52nd anniversary of the series' debut. To mark the event, the InterContinental London - The O2 hotel offered a "Lady Penelope Afternoon Tea" from 15 September until 30 October at which the pop art prints were exhibited.

References

Works cited

Further reading

External links

Thunderbirds merchandise guide
Thunderbirds comics history

Merchandise
Science fiction lists
Spin-offs
Merchandise